Sara Tretola is a Swiss para-cyclist. She won a bronze medal at the 2004 Summer Paralympics.

Career
At the age of 20, Tretola made her Paralympics debut at the 2004 Summer Paralympics and won a bronze medal in the women's road bicycle time trial LC1-4/CP 3/4. She qualified for the 2012 Summer Paralympics but failed to medal after finishing 9th.

References

Living people
Paralympic cyclists of Switzerland
Cyclists at the 2004 Summer Paralympics
Paralympic bronze medalists for Switzerland
Year of birth missing (living people)